Wakod Dam, is an earthfill dam on Nagzari river near Aurangabad in the state of Maharashtra in India.

Specifications

Purpose
 Irrigation

See also
 Dams in Maharashtra
 List of reservoirs and dams in India

References

Dams in Aurangabad district, Maharashtra
Year of establishment missing